Summer of Changsha is a 2019 Chinese crime film directed by Zu Feng. It was screened in the Un Certain Regard section at the 2019 Cannes Film Festival. However, one day before the screening, the team of the film announced they would not be attending the festival due to "technical reasons".

References

External links
 

2019 films
2019 crime films
Chinese crime films
Chinese-language films